Melaleuca plumea is a shrub in the myrtle family, Myrtaceae, and is endemic to the south of Western Australia. It is a widely spreading, densely foliaged shrub which produces masses of deep pink flowers in spring and early summer. Fluffy hairs on parts of the flowers, including the bracts covering the flower buds, are also a feature.

Description

The flowers are a shade of pink or purple. They are arranged in heads near the ends of branches which continue to grow after flowering and also in some of the upper leaf axils. The flower buds are covered with brown bracts. The bracts, flower bases (hypanthia) and sepals are all covered with white fluff. The stamens, which give the flowers their colour, are arranged in 5 bundles around the flower, with 5 to 8 stamens in each bundle.

Taxonomy and naming
Melaleuca plumea was first described in 1999 by Lyndley Craven in a review of the genus. The specific epithet (plumea) is from the Latin plumeus meaning "downy" referring to the woolly parts of the flowers.

Distribution and habitat
This melaleuca occurs in and between the Salmon Gums, Scaddan and Mount Beaumont districts in the Esperance Plains and Mallee biogeographic regions growing in sand or clay, on dune slopes and near salt lakes and river flats.

Conservation
Melaleuca plumea is classified as "not threatened" by the Government of Western Australia Department of Parks and Wildlife.

Essential oils
The leaves of this species contains mainly monoterpenes, especially 1,8-cineole (Eucalyptol).

References

plumea
Myrtales of Australia
Plants described in 1999
Endemic flora of Western Australia
Taxa named by Lyndley Craven